Banknotes of the Philippine peso are issued by the Bangko Sentral ng Pilipinas (Central Bank of the Philippines) for circulation in the Philippines. The smallest amount of legal tender in wide circulation is ₱20 and the largest is ₱1000. The front side of each banknote features prominent people along with buildings, and events in the country's history while the reverse side depicts landmarks and animals.

The dimensions of banknotes issued since the US-Philippine administration, 16 x 6.6 cm, has remained the same on all subsequent Philippine peso banknotes (except pre-1958 centavo notes), and was introduced during William Howard Taft's tenure as governor-general of the Philippines. In view of its highly successful run, President Taft then appointed a committee that reported favorably on the advantages and savings from changing the size of United States banknotes to Philippine-size.

Since 1928 the sizes of the United States Federal Reserve Notes and Philippine banknotes have therefore been nearly identical.

History
On May 1, 1852, the first commercial bank of the Philippines, El Banco Español Filipino de Isabel II issued the following denominations initially 10, 25, 50 and 200 pesos fuertes (strong pesos). They were used until 1896.

First Philippine Republic
The revolutionary republic of Emilio Aguinaldo ordered the issuance of 1, 2, 5, 10, 25, 50, 100-peso banknotes which were signed by Messrs. Pedro A. Paterno, Telesforo Chuidan and Mariano Limjap to avoid counterfeiting. However, only the 1 and 5-peso banknotes have been printed and circulated to some areas by the end of the short-lived First Republic.

American Period

By 1903, the American colonial Insular Government had issued Silver Certificates in denominations of 2, 5 and 10 pesos, backed by silver pesos or U.S. gold dollars at a fixed rate of ₱2/$1. The authorization of the issuance of Philippine Silver Certificates were placed on the notes, "By Authority of an Act of the Congress of the United States of America, approved March 2, 1903." The first shipment of the currency were sent to the Philippines on September 1, 1903, and issued on October of the same year.

In 1905, higher denominations of 20, 50, 100 and 500 pesos were printed. However, amendments were made before the shipment of the notes from the United States to the Philippines to allow gold to be included as a reserve for the Silver Certificates. As the Series of 1905 was printed, but not yet shipped, they were sent to the United States Government Printing Office, and overprinted vertically with, "Subject to the provisions of the Act of Congress, approved June 23, 1906."

In 1908, the El Banco Español Filipino was allowed to print banknotes in the following denominations with text in Spanish: Cinco (5), Diez (10), Veinte (20), Cincuenta (50), Cien (100) and Dos Cientos (200) Pesos. In 1912, the bank was renamed Bank of the Philippine Islands (BPI) and henceforth issued the same banknotes in English.

In 1918, the Silver Certificates were replaced by the Treasury Certificates issued with government-backing of bonds issued by the United States Government in 1, 2, 5, 10, 20, 50, 100 and 500 Pesos. In 1916, the Philippine National Bank (PNB) was created to administer the state-holding shares and print banknotes without any quota from the Philippine Assembly. They printed banknotes in denominations of 1, 2, 5, 10, 20, 50 and 100 pesos. During World War I, the PNB issued emergency notes printed on cardboard paper in the following denominations: 10, 20, 50 centavos and 1 peso. Also overprinted BPI Notes in Five, Ten and Twenty Pesos due to the lack of currency.

The Commonwealth of the Philippines issued Treasury Certificates with the seal of the new government but still circulated the BPI and PNB banknotes.

Japanese government-issued Philippine peso

1942 series

1943-1945 series

Banknotes issued by the Bangko Sentral ng Pilipinas

"VICTORY-CBP" banknotes
The banknotes first issued by today's Bangko Sentral ng Pilipinas (formerly the "Central Bank of the Philippines") were the VICTORY-CBP Overprints in 1949, which were merely overprints of older American-era banknotes.  The first official banknote series to be printed were the English Series in 1951.

English Series (1949–1971)
The English Series were Philippine banknotes that circulated from 1949 to 1969. It was the only banknote series of the Philippine peso to use English.

Pilipino Series (1969–1974)
The Pilipino Series banknotes is the name used to refer to Philippine banknotes issued by the Central Bank of the Philippines from 1969 to 1977, during the term of President Ferdinand Marcos. This series represented a radical change from the English series by undergoing Filipinization and a design change. It was succeeded by the Ang Bagong Lipunan Series of banknotes, to which it shared a similar design. The lowest denomination of the series is 1-piso and the highest is 100-piso.

Ang Bagong Lipunan Series (1973–1996)
The Ang Bagong Lipunan Series (literally, ”The New Society Series") is the name used to refer to Philippine banknotes issued by the Central Bank of the Philippines from 1973 to 1985. It was succeeded by the New Design Series of banknotes. The lowest denomination of the series is 2-piso and the highest is 100-piso.

After the declaration of Proclamation № 1081 by President Ferdinand Marcos on September 23, 1972, the Central Bank was to demonetize the English Series banknotes in 1974, pursuant to Presidential Decree 378. All the unissued Pilipino Series banknotes (except the one peso banknote) were sent back to the De La Rue plant in London for overprinting the watermark area with the words "ANG BAGONG LIPUNAN" and oval geometric safety design. The one peso bill was replaced with the two peso bill, which features the same elements of the demonetized Pilipino series one peso bill.

On September 7, 1978, the Security Printing Plant in Quezon City was inaugurated to produce the banknotes.

The banknotes were still legal tender even after the introduction of the New Design Series banknotes, however it is seldom used after the EDSA Revolution. The banknotes were eventually demonetized on February 2, 1993 (but can still be exchange with legal tender currency to the Central Bank until February 1, 1996) after clamors that the banknotes can be used to buy votes for the 1992 Presidential Elections.

New Design/BSP Series (1985–2017)

By 1983, the committee was deciding on the issuance of new banknotes to replace the Ang Bagong Lipunan Series by issuing seven new banknotes consisting in denominations of 5, 10, 20, 50, 100, 500, and 1000-pesos.

On June 12, 1985, the Central Bank issued the New Design Series starting with a new 5-peso banknote with the face of Emilio Aguinaldo. A new 10-peso banknote with the face of Apolinario Mabini was then introduced on July 1985 a month after the 5-peso banknote was issued. On March 3, 1986, a new 20-peso banknote appeared. After the 1986 People Power Revolution and the new 1987 Constitution was promulgated, the Central Bank issued a new 50, 100- and for the second time a new 500-peso banknote with the face of Benigno Aquino Jr. In 1991, the Central Bank issued for the first time a new 1000-peso banknote, containing the portraits of José Abad Santos, Josefa Llanes Escoda and Vicente Lim.

After the passage of the New Central Bank Act of 1993 when the Bangko Sentral ng Pilipinas (BSP) was reestablished as the central monetary authority, this series was renamed the BSP Series and featured the new seal of the BSP.

On May 2, 1997, the year of issue or printing was introduced on banknotes starting with the release of 10-peso note with Andres Bonifacio and Barasoain Church. This feature was later adapted on other banknotes of the series which are 20, 50, 100, 500, and 1,000 peso notes in 1998. The only banknote of the series that does not use the printing or issue year is the 5-peso note as it stopped being printed in 1995 two years before the printing year was introduced or added on banknotes.

In 1998, the 100,000-peso Centennial banknote, measuring 8.5"x14", accredited by the Guinness Book of World Records as the world's largest legal tender note. It was issued in very limited quantity during the celebration of the Centennial of Philippine Independence.  In the same year, the practice in banknotes since the Commonwealth era of reproducing the signature of the President of the Philippines over the legend "President of the Philippines" was abandoned in favor of explicitly stating the president's name. Also the names of the Philippine president and BSP governor are capitalized, while their titles are now in lowercase.

In 2001, the BSP upgraded the security features (visible fibers, value panel, security thread and watermark) of 1000, 500, and 100-peso banknotes with additional security features like a second glossy security thread, iridescent strip, fluorescent printing, optically variable ink, and microprints. In 2002, the Bangko Sentral issued a new 200-peso banknote with the same aforementioned security features and with the face of former President Diosdado Macapagal. His daughter, Gloria Macapagal Arroyo, is at the back of the 200-peso banknote which showed her being sworn into office at the EDSA Shrine. She is the first president whose image has been included in a banknote while in office since emergency currency was issued by various provincial currency boards during World War II.

On July 8, 2009, the BSP announced that it would recall all bank notes made of abaca and cotton soon and replace it with an all-polymer series. This plan has been abandoned, however, when the New Generation Currency series was launched in December 16, 2010 with all banknotes still made of abaca and cotton.

These banknotes were legal tender alongside the New Generation Currency series until the end of 2015, when the New Generation Currency series became a single circulating set. The New Design/BSP series ceased to be legal tender on January 1, 2016, and were demonetized on December 29, 2017.

Signature pairs of the President of the Philippines and Governor of the Bangko Sentral ng Pilipinas appearing on the banknotes:
 1985–1986: Ferdinand Marcos, Jose B. Fernandez Jr.
 1986–1990: Corazon Aquino, Jose B. Fernandez Jr.
 1990–1992: Corazon Aquino, Jose L. Cuisia Jr.
 1992–1993: Fidel V. Ramos, Jose L. Cuisia Jr.
 1993–1998: Fidel V. Ramos, Gabriel Singson
 1998–1999: Joseph Estrada, Gabriel Singson
 1999–2001: Joseph Estrada, Rafael Buenaventura
 2001–2005: Gloria Macapagal Arroyo, Rafael Buenaventura
 2005–2010: Gloria Macapagal Arroyo, Amando Tetangco Jr.
 2010–2013: Benigno Aquino III, Amando Tetangco Jr.

New Generation Currency Series (current; 2010–present)

In 2009, the Bangko Sentral ng Pilipinas announced that it will launch a massive redesign for its banknotes and coins to further enhance security features and to improve durability. The BSP released the new design of the banknotes on December 16, 2010, along with an initial batch.

The members of the numismatic committee included Bangko Sentral Deputy Governor Diwa Guinigundo and Dr. Ambeth Ocampo, chairman of the National Historical Institute. Designed by Studio 5 Designs and Design Systemat, the new banknotes' designs feature famous Filipinos and iconic natural wonders. Former President Corazon Aquino was added to the 500-peso bill together with Senator Benigno Aquino Jr. The word "Pilipino" is rendered in the reverse in Baybayin. The font used for lettering in the banknotes is Myriad, while the numerals are set in the Twentieth Century font.

The New Generation Currency series is the only circulating set of notes since December 30, 2017. In 2017, the BSP updated the design of the NGC series banknotes with the following changes:
 Enlarged the font size of the year of issue (all banknotes)
 Italicized the scientific names on the reverse (all banknotes)
 Replaced the images of the Aguinaldo Shrine and the Barasoain Church on the obverse side of the ₱200 banknote with scenes of the Declaration of Philippine Independence and the opening of the Malolos Congress respectively.
 The text "October 1944" was added after the word "Leyte Landing" at the obverse of the ₱50 banknote
 The Order of Lakandula Medal and the phrase “Medal of Honor” were removed on the obverse side of the ₱1000 banknote

In 2020, the Enhanced NGC series all banknotes except for the ₱20 were updated with the following changes:
 The addition of intaglio tactile markings for the visually impaired in the form of horizontal bands (all banknotes)
 The addition of an improved windowed security thread for the ₱100, ₱200, ₱500, ₱1000 banknotes featuring indigenous weaving patterns.
 For the ₱1000 note the thread size has been increased to 5 millimetres, with the rest remaining the same.
 For the ₱500 and ₱1000, the denomination value has been embossed with optically variable ink wherein the color changes if the banknote is tilted.
 A stylized Philippine Flag has also been added with optically variable ink on the ₱500 note replacing optically variable device patch.
 The Concealed Value are more reflective (all banknotes). 
 For the ₱500 and ₱1000, the denomination at the left has a rolling bar effect which you can tilt, and changing colors. 

On December 7, 2022, the 2020 BSP logo is now used on 20, 50, 100, 500, and 1,000-peso (non-polymer version) bills which replaced the 2010 logo that has been in use since the series' launch in December 16, 2010 upon the release of banknotes bearing the signatures of President Ferdinand Marcos, Jr. and BSP Governor Felipe Medalla.

Signature pairs of the President of the Philippines and Governor of the Bangko Sentral ng Pilipinas appearing on the banknotes:
 2010–2016: Benigno Aquino III, Amando Tetangco Jr.
 2016–2017: Rodrigo Duterte, Amando Tetangco Jr.
 2017–2019: Rodrigo Duterte, Nestor Espenilla Jr.
 2019–2022: Rodrigo Duterte, Benjamin Diokno
 2022–present:  Bongbong Marcos, Felipe Medalla

Errors
Several errors have been discovered on banknotes of the New Generation series and have become the subject of ridicule on social networking sites. Among these are the exclusion of Batanes from the Philippine map on the reverse of all denominations, the mislocation of the Puerto Princesa Subterranean Underground River on the reverse of the 500-peso bill and the Tubbataha Reef on the 1000-peso bill, and the incorrect coloring on the beak and feathers of the blue-naped parrot on the 500-peso bill. The scientific names of the animals featured on the reverse sides of all banknotes were incorrectly rendered as well.

According to Design Systemat, the designers of the new bills, that drafts prepared by the company of the new 500-peso bill shows a red beak of the blue-naped parrot. This color was changed by the printers to account for practical printing concerns. The designers further explains that printing banknotes is not like printing brochures. Due to the intaglio printing and limited printing capability of banknote printers, it can only produce a limited full color reproduction.

The alleged mislocation of the Tubbataha Reef on the one thousand peso note was due to a security feature, a smaller version of the featured species on the bills' reverse (which is also featured on all banknote denominations) was located on top of the exact location of the Tubbataha Reef on the map. Giving the option of either moving the key security feature on the standard position or locating the Tubbataha marker correctly, the bills' French printers, Oberthur Technologies, decided to move the reef marker slightly south on the Philippine map.

Commemorative banknotes
Commemorative banknotes have been issued by the Bangko Sentral ng Pilipinas to memorialize events of historic significance to the Philippines. Most commonly they were issued by adding a commemorative overprint on the watermark area of a circulating denomination. Less common are especially-designed non-circulating commemorative banknotes sold to collectors at a premium over face value.

Commemorative overprint banknotes summary
 Ang Bagong Lipunan Series:
 50-piso, 1978: Sergio Osmeña Centennial
 10-piso, 1981: Inauguration of President Ferdinand Marcos
 2-piso, 1981: Pope John Paul II's visit to the Philippines
 5-piso, New Design Series:
 1986: President Corazon Aquino's visit to the United States
 1987: Canonization of Blessed Lorenzo Ruiz
 1989: 40th Anniversary of Bangko Sentral ng Pilipinas
 1990: Kababaihan Para sa Kaunlaran (Women for Progress)
 1990: 2nd Plenary Council of the Philippines
 50-piso, New Design Series:
 1999: 50 Years of Central Banking in the Philippines
 2012: DFA-ASEAN 45th Anniversary
 2013: Canonization of St. Pedro Calungsod
 2013: PDIC 50th Anniversary
 2013: Trinity University of Asia 50th Anniversary
 100-piso, New Design Series:
 1998: Philippine Declaration of Independence Centennial
 2008: University of the Philippines Centennial
 2011: UP College of Law Centennial
 2011: Ateneo Law School 75th Anniversary
 2012: De La Salle University Centennial
 2012: Philippine Masonic Centennial
 2012: Manila Hotel Centennial
 2013: Bangko Sentral ng Pilipinas 20th Anniversary
 2013: Department of Agriculture/ National Year of Rice
 2013: Iglesia ni Kristo Centennial
 2013: Pilipinas Shell Petroleum Corporation Centennial
 Other, New Design Series:
 20-piso, 2004: International Year of Microcredit
 All denominations (20-piso to 1000-piso), 2009: 60th Anniversary of Central Banking in the Philippines
 200-piso, 2011: University of Santo Tomas 400th Anniversary
 500-piso, 2012: Asian Development Bank Manila 2012 Board of Governors Annual Meeting

Higher value commemorative banknotes

2,000 piso

The Central Bank of the Philippines (Bangko Sentral ng Pilipinas) issued only 300,000 pieces of this 216 mm x 133 mm 2,000 Philippine peso centennial commemorative legal tender banknote. Another version, with the same design but measured at 160 x 66 mm, was also planned to be issued as legal tender in 2001, but due to the ouster of President Joseph Estrada as the result of the Second EDSA revolution (EDSA People Power II), the notes were stored in the vaults of the Bangko Sentral ng Pilipinas. As of 2010, the bank was considering destroying the bulk of the unissued notes (known as the "New Millennium" or "Erap" notes), saving only 50,000 of the five million pieces to be demonetized for "historical, educational, numismatic, or other purposes". However it was not until 2012 that the bank began selling this numismatic product in a folder that clearly stipulates that the notes are not legal tender.

The obverse side features President Joseph Estrada taking his oath of office on June 30, 1998, in the historic Barasoain Church, the seat of the first democratic republic in Asia shown in the background as well as the scroll of the Malolos Constitution and the seal of the BSP (Bangko Sentral ng Pilipinas). The reverse side depicts the re-enactment of the declaration of Philippine Independence at the Aguinaldo Shrine in Kawit, Cavite on June 12, 1998, by President Fidel V. Ramos and also features the Philippine Centennial Commission logo. The security features of the note include a 3-dimensional cylinder mold-made portrait watermark of the two presidents and the years 1898–1998, iridescent band, color-shift windowed security thread, latent image and perfect see-through register.

100,000 piso

The 100,000-peso centennial note, measuring 356 x 216 mm, was accredited by the Guinness Book of World Records as the world's largest legal tender note in terms of size. 1,000 pieces were issued during the celebration of the centennial of Philippine independence in 1998. It has since been surpassed by the somewhat larger 600 Malaysian ringgit banknote.

5,000 piso

On January 18, 2021, Bangko Sentral ng Pilipinas, in cooperation with the Quincentennial Commemorations in the Philippines launches the 5,000-Piso Commemorative Non-Circulating Banknote, in honor of heroism of Lapulapu. On its obverse, the banknote depicts a young Lapulapu, an image of the Battle of Mactan, the QCP logo, and the Karakoa, the large outrigger warships used by native Filipinos, while on its reverse shows the Philippine eagle, or the Manaol, which symbolizes clear vision, freedom, and strength; and which embodies the ancient Visayan belief that all living creatures originated from an eagle, also featured are the tree of a coconut, which was food the people of Samar provided to Ferdinand Magellan and his crew; and Mount Apo, which is located in Mindanao, where the circumnavigators finally found directional clues to their intended destination of Maluku or the Spice Island.

Summary of the Philippine banknote series

References

External links
 Philippine Banknotes and Coins
 Philippine Coins News & Updates
 Philippine currency during WWII